
This is a list of the Areas of Special Scientific Interest (ASSIs) in County Tyrone in Northern Ireland, United Kingdom.

In Northern Ireland the body responsible for designating ASSIs is the Northern Ireland Environment Agency – a division of the Department of Environment (DoE).

Unlike the SSSIs, ASSIs include both natural environments and man-made structures. As with SSSIs, these sites are designated if they have criteria based on fauna, flora, geological or physiographical features. On top of this, structures are also covered, such as the Whitespots mines in Conlig, according to several criterion including rarity, recorded history and intrinsic appeal.

For other sites in the rest of the United Kingdom, see List of SSSIs by Area of Search.

Data is available from the Northern Ireland Environment Agency's website in the form of citation sheets for each ASSI.

 Aghabrack ASSI
 Annaghagh Bog ASSI
 Ballysudden ASSI
 Baronscourt ASSI
 Bardahessiagh ASSI
 Benburb ASSI
 Black Bog ASSI
 Black Lough ASSI
 Brookend ASSI
 Butterlope Glen ASSI
 Cashel Rock ASSI
 Caledon and Tynan ASSI
 Corbylin Wood ASSI
 Cranny Bogs ASSI
 Cullentra Lough ASSI
 Deroran Bog ASSI
 Derrycloony Lough ASSI
 Dromore ASSI
 Drumcrow ASSI
 Drumharvey ASSI
 Drumlea and Mullan Woods ASSI
 Drummond Quarry ASSI
 Dunnaree Hill ASSI
 Essan Burn and Mullyfamore ASSI
 Fairy Water Bogs ASSI
 Fardross Stream ASSI
 Fymore Lough ASSI
 Glenmore Wood ASSI
 Grange Wood ASSI
 Kirlish ASSI
 Knocknacloy ASSI
 Lisdoo ASSI
 Lisnaragh ASSI
 Limehill Farm ASSI
 Little River ASSI
 Lough Corr ASSI
 Lough Macrory ASSI
 Lough McCall ASSI
 Lough Doo ASSI
 Lough Na Blaney Bane ASSI
 Lough Neagh ASSI
 Lurgylea ASSI
 Mountfield Quarry ASSI
 Mullaghcarn ASSI
 McKean's Moss ASSI
 McKean's Moss Part II ASSI
 Moneygal Bog ASSI
 Moneygal Bog Part II ASSI
 Murrins ASSI
 Owenkillew and Glenelly Woods ASSI
 Owenkillew River ASSI
 Rehaghy Wood ASSI
 River Faughan and Tributaries ASSI
 River Foyle and Tributaries ASSI
 Round Lough and Lough Fadda ASSI
 Scraghy ASSI
 Silverbrook Wood ASSI
 Slieve Beagh ASSI
 Sloughan and Willmount Glens ASSI
 Strabane Glen ASSI
 Straduff ASSI
 Tanderagee ASSI
 Teal Lough and Slaghtfreeden Bogs ASSI
 Teal Lough Part II ASSI
 Tonnagh Beg Bog ASSI
 Tully Bog ASSI
 Upper Ballinderry River ASSI

References

Areas of Special Scientific Interest in Northern Ireland
Geography of County Tyrone
Areas of Special Scientific